Dennis Smith (born July 27, 1964 in Livonia, Michigan) is a former American professional ice hockey defenseman who played for the Washington Capitals and Los Angeles Kings in the National Hockey League (NHL).

External links
 

1964 births
Living people
Adirondack Red Wings players
American men's ice hockey defensemen
Baltimore Skipjacks players
Detroit Vipers players
Ice hockey players from Michigan
Sportspeople from Livonia, Michigan
Los Angeles Kings players
Maine Mariners players
New Haven Nighthawks players
Providence Bruins players
Undrafted National Hockey League players
Washington Capitals players